Maktaktujanak Island is an uninhabited Baffin Island offshore island located east of Shakshukuk Island in the Arctic Archipelago in Nunavut's Qikiqtaaluk Region.

References

External links 
 Maktaktujanak Island in the Atlas of Canada - Toporama; Natural Resources Canada

Islands of Baffin Island
Islands of Cumberland Sound
Uninhabited islands of Qikiqtaaluk Region